Martin Cohen may refer to:

 Martin Cohen (soccer) (born 1952), South African footballer who played for the Los Angeles Aztecs
 Martin Cohen (philosopher) (born 1964), author of several popular books in philosophy, philosophy of science and political philosophy
 Martin Samuel Cohen, rabbi of the Shelter Rock Jewish Center in Roslyn, New York
 Martin Cohen (entrepreneur), founder of Latin Percussion in New York
 Martin Cohen (1953–2020), film editor and head chief of post-production at Paramount Pictures, DreamWorks Pictures and Amblin Entertainment